The 22919/22920 MGR Chennai Central - Ahmedabad Junction Humsafar Express is an express operated by Indian Railways connecting MGR Chennai Central in Tamil Nadu and Ahmedabad Junction in Gujarat.

It is operated with 22919/22920 train numbers on a weekly basis.

Traction
 It is hauled by a Vijaywada WAP 4 on its entire journey.

Coaches 

The train use 3-tier AC sleeper trains designed by Indian Railways with LED screen display to show information about stations, train speed etc. It is planned to have announcement system, vending machines for tea, coffee and milk, and bio toilets in compartments as well as CCTV cameras.

In September 2019, sleeper coaches were added to the train.

Route & Halts 

 Puratchi Thalaivar Dr. M.G. Ramachandran Central Railway Station

See also
Humsafar Express

Notes

References

Transport in Ahmedabad
Transport in Chennai
Humsafar Express trains
Rail transport in Tamil Nadu
Rail transport in Andhra Pradesh
Rail transport in Karnataka
Rail transport in Maharashtra
Rail transport in Gujarat
Railway services introduced in 2017